Marolambo is a district of Atsinanana in Madagascar.

References 

Districts of Atsinanana